Aishwarya Mourya (born 21 February 1994) is an Indian cricketer. He made his List A debut for Chhattisgarh in the 2018–19 Vijay Hazare Trophy on 8 October 2018. He made his Twenty20 debut for Chhattisgarh in the 2018–19 Syed Mushtaq Ali Trophy on 21 February 2019.

References

External links
 

1994 births
Living people
Indian cricketers
Chhattisgarh cricketers
Place of birth missing (living people)